Yevgeny Borisovich Samsonov (15 September 1926 – 30 September 2014) was a Russian rower who competed for the Soviet Union in the 1952 Summer Olympics and in the 1956 Summer Olympics.

In 1952 he won the silver medal as crew member of the Soviet boat in the eight event.

Four years later he was part of the Soviet boat which was eliminated in the semi-final of the eight competition.

In 1953–1955 he won three years in a row European championship as crew member of the Soviet boat in the eights event.

References

External links
 

1926 births
2014 deaths
Russian male rowers
Soviet male rowers
Olympic rowers of the Soviet Union
Rowers at the 1952 Summer Olympics
Rowers at the 1956 Summer Olympics
Olympic silver medalists for the Soviet Union
Olympic medalists in rowing
Medalists at the 1952 Summer Olympics
European Rowing Championships medalists